Corundum is the name for a structure prototype in inorganic solids, derived from the namesake polymorph of aluminum oxide (α-Al2O3). Other compounds, especially among the inorganic solids, exist in corundum structure, either in ambient or other conditions. Corundum structures are associated with metal-insulator transition, ferroelectricity, polar magnetism, and magnetoelectric effects.

Structure 
The corundum structure has the space group . It typically exists in binary compounds of the type A2B3, where A is metallic and B is nonmetallic, including sesquioxides (A2O3), sesquisulfides (A2S3), etc. When A is nonmetallic and B is metallic, the structure becomes the antiphase of corundum, called the anticorundum structure type, with examples including β-Ca3N2 and borates. Ternary and multinary compounds can also exists in the corundum structure. The corundum-like structure with the composition A2BB'O6 is called double corundum. A list of examples are tabulated below.

See also 
 Corundum
 Ilmenite
 Perovskite (structure)

References 

Crystal structure types
Crystallography
Mineralogy